The SIS Card (SIS = Système Information Sociale, English: Social Information System) in Belgium was a chip card system. The cards were credit card size and were used to justify the rights of the owner (or their legal guardian, for minors) to access a social security system when spending on medicine.

The card was first issued in 1998 for all people living in Belgium. Since October 1, 1998 it was compulsory for every Belgian citizen to possess a SIS card. In August 2011, it was announced the cards will stop being issued soon. Starting on January 1, 2012, citizens wishing to do so, (and with their medic's pharmacist's agreement) could show their ID card instead of SIS. However, a medic or pharmacist could not refuse a SIS card and could refuse to accept an ID card. Starting on January 1, 2014, SIS cards are no longer compulsory for Belgian citizens, no longer issued, and health workers are allowed to refuse them. Boxes where citizens could throw their SIS cards in order to trash them where then created. On January 1, 2017, all cards then active will expire and they cannot be any longer accepted. The card was replaced by isi+ Card.

Government of Belgium
Identity documents
1998 establishments in Belgium
2013 disestablishments in Belgium